Lammar Wright Jr. (September 26, 1924 – July 8, 1983) was an American jazz trumpeter. He was born in Kansas City, Missouri, the son of trumpeter Lammar Wright Sr., and died in Los Angeles.

Wright's credits are not always clear because many records do not append the suffix "Jr." or "Sr." to the player's name. Furthermore, father and son would sometimes substitute for each other on some recordings. Lammar Wright Jr. worked with Lionel Hampton from 1943 to 1946, then followed with stints in Dizzy Gillespie's band (1947) and as the principal soloist for Charlie Barnet.

Discography

With Dizzy Gillespie
The Complete RCA Victor Recordings (Bluebird, 1937-1949, [1995])

References
[ Lammar Wright Jr.] at Allmusic
Beck/Kernfeld, "Lammar Wright Jr.". Grove Jazz online.

1924 births
1983 deaths
American jazz trumpeters
American male trumpeters
Jazz musicians from Missouri
20th-century American musicians
20th-century trumpeters
20th-century American male musicians
American male jazz musicians